Frederick Duff Burchell (July 14, 1879 – November 20, 1951) was a starting pitcher in Major League Baseball for the Philadelphia Phillies (1903) and Boston Red Sox (1907–1909). Burchell batted right-handed and threw left-handed.

In a four-season career, Burchell posted a 13–15 record with 124 strikeouts and a 2.93 ERA in  innings pitched.

Burchell won ten games for the 1908 Boston Red Sox as part of a rotation that included Cy Young, Cy Morgan and Eddie Cicotte. He later played for several minor league teams and managed the Newark Bears in their 1926 inaugural season.

External links
Baseball Reference
Retrosheet

Boston Americans players
Boston Red Sox players
Philadelphia Phillies players
Major League Baseball pitchers
1879 births
1951 deaths
Minor league baseball managers
Evansville River Rats players
Baltimore Orioles (IL) players
Buffalo Bisons (minor league) players
Montreal Royals players
Syracuse Stars (minor league baseball) players
Baseball players from New Jersey
Sportspeople from Perth Amboy, New Jersey